Athyrium distentifolium commonly known as alpine lady-fern  is a fern found in widely in the Northern Hemisphere.

It is a common upland variety above 600 metres in the Highlands of Scotland,  with more than 10% of the UK population being found in the Cairngorm mountains, especially on scree slopes in  Glen Feshie, and on Ben Avon, Ben MacDui and Beinn a' Bhùird. Regarded as nationally scarce, it is a snow-tolerant species. The stunted form var. flexile, which is found at 750 metres and above, is found at only 4 sites and is endemic to Scotland.

The subspecies americanum is found in the mountains of western United States, Alaska, Canada and coastal Greenland, and is sometimes classified as a separate species Athyrium americanum.

References

External links

Photographs

distentifolium
Flora of Scotland
Ferns of the United States